The Johanna, also known as the Aomo, is a river of south-western New Britain. It flows into the sea near Aivet Island.

References

Rivers of New Britain